The Rowville railway line is a proposed extension to the suburban rail network of Melbourne, Australia. The line was first proposed by the 1969 Melbourne Transportation Plan, and a variety of studies have been conducted into its feasibility and possible routes, but no construction work has been undertaken. Major obstacles to the line's construction include the proposed connection to the existing Dandenong corridor, one of the busiest in Melbourne, and the lack of a protected reservation in which to build the line. As a consequence, various alternative proposals for providing mass public transport to the Rowville area have also been proposed, although none have yet been constructed.

Background 
It forms part of the City of Knox local government area. The main Clayton campus of Monash University is nearby, designated as a major suburban employment cluster in the Melbourne 2030 development plan.

Stations on the Lilydale, Glen Waverley and Dandenong lines are within  of Rowville and the university, but the area is described by local residents as a "black hole" for public transport due to a lack of coordinated or high-frequency bus services.

History 
The 1969 Transportation Plan recommended three significant extensions to the suburban rail network: a Doncaster railway line; a connection from Frankston to Dandenong and a semi-orbital line from the Dandenong line near Huntingdale to the Belgrave line near Ferntree Gully via the Rowville area.

A study conducted by consultants for the government of Premier Jeff Kennett in the late 1990s to examine alternatives to the Scoresby Freeway investigated an extension of the Glen Waverley line to the Rowville area. It estimated the cost at $326 million but found patronage would be too low to justify the outlay.

The railway line was brought up again in the Public Transport Victoria network development plan including a new railway station at Monash University this project will be expected to carry out in stage 3 of the plan.

See also 
Doncaster railway line – another line proposed by the 1969 Transportation Plan but never constructed
Melbourne Airport rail link – another proposed but unconstructed rail extension however is expected to open by 2029

References 

Proposed railway lines in Australia
Railway lines in Victoria (Australia)